The city government of Chelsea, Massachusetts was incorporated in 1857. From 1739 to 1857, Chelsea was incorporated as a town. From 1857 to 1991 (with the exception of 1908 to 1911), the city's head of government was the mayor of Chelsea. The office of mayor ceased to exist after the city went into receivership. Since 1995, Chelsea has been led by a city manager.

Town government
Chelsea was settled as part of Boston in 1624 by Samuel Maverick under the name of Winnisimmet (meaning "good spring nearby"). In 1739, Winnisimmet, along with the settlements Rumney Marsh, and Pullen Point (excluding Hog Island and Noddle's Island) was incorporated as a town. Upon its incorporation the town named after Chelsea, a neighborhood in London, England. Under this form of government, Chelsea was governed by a Town Meeting and Board of Selectmen. On February 22, 1841, part of Chelsea was annexed by Saugus, Massachusetts. On March 19, 1846, Rumney Marsh and Pullen Point became a separate town known as North Chelsea. Pullen Point later separated from North Chelsea to form Winthrop, Massachusetts and the remainder of North Chelsea changed its name to Revere, Massachusetts.

City government

Mayor and aldermen
In 1857, Chelsea was incorporated as a city. It was governed by a mayor and board of aldermen. The city's first mayor was Francis B. Fay.

Board of Control
On April 12, 1908, nearly half the city was destroyed and 18,000 people (56% of the population) were left homeless by the first Great Chelsea Fire. In May 1908 the Massachusetts General Court passed an act creating a Board of Control to perform the duties of the mayor and board of aldermen during the recovery. It also appointed a five-member School Committee to take the place the fifteen-member elected one. The board consisted of five members appointed by Acting Governor Eben Sumner Draper. Three were appointed to a term of five years, one was appointed to a term of two years, and one was appointed to a term of one year. The members selected to the two- and one-year term were subject to reelection by the voters of Chelsea. In 1911, elections were held for the board of aldermen and mayor. However, the Board of Control remained as a supervisory board. In 1912, the board was dissolved as a result of a referendum.

Acting Governor Draper appointed William E. McClintock, a civil engineer and former chairman of the Massachusetts Highway Commission and City Engineer of Chelsea, Mark Wilmarth, a civil engineer from Malden, Massachusetts, Alton C. Ratschesky, a financier from Boston and Beverly, Massachusetts who was president of the United States Trust Company, Alton E. Briggs, a former teacher at Chelsea High School, and businessman George H. Dunham to the board. Dunham and Briggs were subject to reelection; Dunham in 1909 and Briggs in 1910. Both were reelected. The board met for the first time on June 3, 1908 and McClintock was elected chairman.

Return of mayor and aldermen
On December 12, 1911, Chelsea elected its first mayor and board of aldermen since the Board of Control took charge of the city government. James H. Malone defeated George W. Ford by 791 votes to become the city's first mayor in over three years. Alexander Cook, Marcus M. Merritt, William S. Young, William A. O'Brien, George F. Henderson, Jr., James J. Kane, Samuel Markell, David Wilte, and William J. Williams were elected to the board of aldermen, and Cook was chosen to serve as the board's president. Malone and the board were sworn in on January 1, 1912.

Receivership
During the late 1980s and early 1990s, the city was facing financial difficulties due to poor municipal accounting and unsound decisions made by the city's elected leaders. By 1991, Chelsea was facing a $9.5 million deficit and was faced with the possibility of laying off 25% of the city's employees. A proposed $2 million Proposition 2 1/2 override was rejected by the voters, which prevented the city from raising taxes high enough to cover the deficit. The city was faced with the possibility of being annexed by Boston or entering state receivership. On September 11, 1991, the state legislature approved Governor William Weld's proposal to appoint a receiver to take over Chelsea's municipal government. The receiver was granted almost unilateral control of the city, including the sole power to formulate budgets, issue bonds, and abrogate contracts. The office of mayor was eliminated and the board of aldermen was reduced to an advisory role. Weld chose businessman and former state Commissioner of Commerce, Secretary of Transportation, and MBTA Chairman James Carlin to serve as the city's receiver.

City manager and city council
In August 1995, a new city charter was enacted.  The new charter placed policy and legislative authority in an eleven-member city council and vested strong executive and administrative powers in an appointed city manager. The city manager is the chief executive of the city and is responsible for the day-to-day administration of city affairs.

List of mayors
This is a list of the Mayors of Chelsea, Massachusetts.

List of city managers
This is a list of the city managers of Chelsea, Massachusetts.

See also
Chelsea Historical Society, Mayors of Chelsea 1857 – 1991.

References

Local government in Massachusetts
Chelsea, Massachusetts
1857 establishments in Massachusetts